Tave is a surname. Notable people with the surname include: 

Stuart Tave (born 1923), American literary scholar
Vivianne Fock Tave, Seychellois diplomat

See also
Dave (surname)
Tare (surname)